Skate Australia is the recognised governing body for skate sports and skateboarding in Australia, working in partnership with Sport Australia. The body oversees the management and development of the sports from the national team at the elite level, the conduct of national and international events, through to grass roots participation.

Governance

Skate Australia provides a minimal level of insurance for some roller derby leagues in Australia. According to Skate Australia's 2009-2013 strategic plan, the governance of roller derby is different from other sports affiliated with the organisation. Roller derby lacks state committees, with leagues going straight to the Development Officer and Sport Services Administrator.  In 2006, there were no roller derby members in Skate Australia. By 2008, three percent of all members were from the roller derby community.

Funding and Support 
Skate Australia is supported by Sport Australia.

See also

 International Roller Sports Federation
 International Roller Sports Federation - Inline
 Roller derby in Australia

References

External links
Skate Australia

Roller skating organizations
Roller derby in Australia
Sports governing bodies in Australia